Meiser (also known as Shaykh Maysar or Khirbat Maysar) is an Arab village in northern Israel. Located half a kilometre west of the Green Line, north of the city of Baqa al-Gharbiyye in the triangle area of Wadi Ara, it is one of three Arab villages under the jurisdiction of Menashe Regional Council.

History

Antiquity
Remains from  the Early Roman era (end of the first century BCE–beginning of the first century CE) have been found here.

Three strata from the Roman-Byzantine periods was excavated in the centre of the village. A bathhouse, dating from the same time, has also been found.

Ceramics and other remains from the Byzantine era have been found here.

An excavation revealed remains dating from the end of the Byzantine period (7th century CE), and above it were remains of a residential house from the Abbasid period (9th–10th centuries CE).

Ottoman era
In 1882, the PEF's Survey of Western Palestine (SWP) found at Sheikh Meisir "foundations near a modern Mukam" (Muslim tomb). In spite of this, Andrew Petersen, who inspected the Maqam in 1994, suggested "that the building may be considerably older than the nineteenth century."

British Mandate era
In the 1922 census of Palestine, conducted by the British Mandate authorities, Kherbet Maisir had a population of 49 Muslims. 

In the 1945 statistics Meiser was counted with Qaffin and Kh. el Aqaba, together they had a  population of 1,570 Muslims,  with a land area of  23,755  dunams,  according to an official land and population survey. Of this, 5,863 dunams were plantations and irrigable land, 8,371 were used for cereals, while 40 dunams were built-up (urban) land.

See also
 Arab localities in Israel
 Wadi Ara

References

Bibliography

External links
Village website
 Welcome To Kh. al-Shaykh Meiser
Survey of Western Palestine, Map 8: IAA, Wikimedia commons

Arab villages in Israel
Wadi Ara
Populated places in Haifa District